The 2022–23 Metal Ligaen season is the 66th season of the Metal Ligaen, the top level of ice hockey in Denmark.

Teams 

The same nine teams from the 2021–22 season returned.

Regular season

Results

References

External links 
 Metal Ligaen official website
 Results - Metal Ligaen 2022-2023
 Metal Ligaen on eurohockey.com
 Metal Ligaen on eliteprospects.com

2022 in Danish sport
2023 in Danish sport
2022–23 in European ice hockey leagues
Seasons in Superisligaen